Franck Yannick Kessié (born 19 December 1996) is an Ivorian professional footballer who plays as a midfielder for La Liga club Barcelona and the Ivory Coast national team.

Club career
Born in Ouragahio, Kessié began his career in Stella Club d'Adjamé, joining their youth setup in 2010. In 2014, he was promoted to the first team.

Atalanta
On 29 January 2015, Kessié signed a three-year contract with Serie A club Atalanta. He was assigned to the club's Primavera squad upon his arrival and contributed with seven appearances for the side. His first match in Europe occurred on 1 March, as he started in a 2–0 away win against AC Milan Primavera.

On 18 April 2015, Kessié was called up to the first team for a match against Roma, but remained an unused substitute in the 1–1 draw the following day.

Cesena (loan)
On 26 August 2015, Kessié joined Cesena in the Serie B on a one-year loan deal. He made his professional debut on 26 September, coming on as a substitute for Antonino Ragusa in a 0–0 away draw against Perugia.

Kessié scored his first professional goal on 31 October 2015, netting the last in a 2–0 home win against Virtus Lanciano. He became an undisputed starter afterwards, appearing in 37 matches and scoring four goals as his side missed out promotion in the play-offs.

Return to Atalanta
After returning from loan, Kessié was promoted to the first team by manager Gian Piero Gasperini. After appearing with the main squad during the pre-season, he made his debut for La Dea on 13 August 2016, starting and scoring the last in a 3–0 Coppa Italia home win against Cremonese. Six days later, he renewed his contract until 2021.

Kessié made his debut in the main category of Italian football on 21 August 2016, as he started and scored a brace in a 4–3 home loss against Lazio. He scored another goal seven days later, in a 2–1 away defeat to Sampdoria.

Kessié subsequently became a mainstay in Gasperini's starting eleven, scoring the winners against Torino (2–1 home win) and Roma (2–1 home win), both through penalties. He also scored the equalizer against Empoli on 20 December 2016, with Marco D'Alessandro scoring a last-minute winner.

AC Milan
On 2 June 2017, Kessié joined fellow Serie A side AC Milan on a two-year loan deal with the obligation to buy. Originally, he chose 19 as his shirt number but soon was persuaded by the club's management to leave it for Leonardo Bonucci, who transferred to Milan a few weeks later; as a result, Kessié changed it to 79. Following Bonucci's departure in the next summer transfer window, he was offered his original shirt number back yet refused, citing that he did not want to force Milan fans to spend any extra money on his personalized shirts due to yet another number change.

2017–18
He made his debut for Milan and helped the club to win the first leg of Europa League qualification match against CS U Craiova on 27 July. On 20 August 2017, in Milan's opening Serie A match of the season, he scored a penalty in a 3–0 victory over Crotone. In a match against Cagliari on 21 January 2018, Kessié scored two goals, one being from the penalty spot, to give Milan the win.

2018–19
On 31 August 2018, he scored the opening goal against Roma in an eventual 2–1 win. On 16 January 2019, Kessie was sent off in 2018 Supercoppa Italiana final against Juventus, which the latter won 1-0. On 13 April, he scored the only goal in 1–0 win against Lazio.
On 26 May, he scored a brace against SPAL in an eventual 3-2 win.

2019–20

On 5 October 2019, he scored the winning goal in an away fixture against Genoa.
On 7 July 2020, he scored the equalizer to help Milan comeback in a 4–2 win against Juventus.
On 12 July, he scored a penalty for a final 2–2 score against Napoli. On 15 July he scored the equalizer against Parma in a 3–1 win, a powerful shot from 25 metres.

2020–21: Personal success
On 27 September, Kessie scored his first goal of the season against Crotone, a penalty kick in a 2–0 win.
On 1 November, he scored the opening goal in a 2–1 win against Udinese at Stadio Friuli.
On 29 November against Fiorentina, he scored a penalty and missed another as his team managed to win 2-0. On 6th of December against Sampdoria at Luigi Ferraris, he scored from the penalty spot in the final minute of the first half, to gave his team the lead in difficult 2-1 win.
On 28 February 2021, he scored from a penalty kick against Roma as his side won 2–1.
On 23 May, he scored two penalties in a 2–0 away win over his former club Atalanta, to secure second place for Milan in the 2020–21 Serie A and qualification for the 2021–22 UEFA Champions League after an eight-year absence.
Kessie became the first player to score at least ten penalties for AC Milan in a Serie A season since Zlatan Ibrahimovic in 2011–12; he played 50 matches this season in all competitions, a record between Serie A players with Politano.
He scored 13 league goals this season, a personal record,
 he also assisted six goals, described as 'player of the season for Milan by some critics.

2021–22: Scudetto winner and departure
On 12 September 2021 against Lazio, Kessie won a penalty kick but failed to convert it; Milan still managed to win the match 2–0. On 28 September, in a UEFA Champions League match against Atletico, as Milan was leading by 1–0, Kessie was sent off in the 29th minute, his side eventually lost 1–2. On 31 October against Roma, he converted a penalty kick to score the second and seal a 2–1 victory for Milan. On 7 November, while playing against Inter he fouled Hakan Çalhanoğlu in the penalty box, causing a penalty kick which the latter scored in a 1–1 draw.
On 4 December, Kessie scored the first goal against Salernitana in an eventual 2–0 win.
On 22 December, Kessie scored a brace against Empoli, reaching 14 Serie A goals during the 2021 calendar year; the last AC Milan midfielder to score so much in a single calendar year was Kaká in 2008.

On 22 May 2022, Kessie scored the third goal in a 3-0 rout against Sassuolo, sealing the Scudetto title for the club; after the goal, Kessie went to Milan fans at the Mapei Stadium and did his trademark salute, it was Kessie's last match and goal with Milan, as he announced his departure a few days later and thanked the fans.

2022–23: Barcelona

On 4 July 2022, Barcelona announced that they had reached an agreement with Kessiè after his contract expires with AC Milan and on 6 July, he signed a four-year deal until 30 June 2026, and his buy out clause will be set at €500m. On 13 August, he made his debut for the club, as a substitute, in 0–0 draw against Rayo Vallecano in the league.

International career
Kessié represented Ivory Coast at under-17 and under-20 levels, appearing in the 2013 FIFA U-17 World Cup and 2015 Toulon Tournament. During the former tournament, the Royal Moroccan Football Federation submitted a complaint to FIFA claiming that Kessié was aged 22 and not 16; FIFA later denied that claim.

At the age of 17, Kessié played his first international game with the senior national team on 6 September 2014, starting in a 2–1 home win against Sierra Leone for the 2015 Africa Cup of Nations qualification. On 4 January 2017, he was included in Michel Dussuyer's 23-man squad ahead of the 2017 Africa Cup of Nations, starting in all matches as his side was knocked out in the group stage.

At the 2019 Africa Cup of Nations, he finished as the joint-top assist provider of the tournament, alongside Ismaël Bennacer, with three assists. His team were eliminated in the quarter-finals by eventual champions Algeria after losing 4–3 on penalties following a 1–1 draw on 11 July; Kessié converted his nation's first penalty in the shoot-out.

Personal life
When Kessié was 11 years old, his father, who used to be a professional footballer in his youth before enlisting in the Ivorian army, died due to an illness. Therefore, one of his goal celebrations is a military salute performed in order to pay tribute to his late father. Growing up his idol was Yaya Touré.

Career statistics

Club

International

Scores and results list Ivory Coast's goal tally first.

Honours
AC Milan
 Serie A: 2021–22

Barcelona
Supercopa de España: 2022–23

Individual
Serie A Team of the Year: 2020–21

References

External links

 Profile at the FC Barcelona website
 
 
 

1996 births
Living people
People from Gôh-Djiboua District
Ivorian footballers
Ivory Coast youth international footballers
Ivory Coast under-20 international footballers
Ivory Coast international footballers
Association football midfielders
Atalanta B.C. players
A.C. Cesena players
A.C. Milan players
FC Barcelona players
Serie A players
Serie B players
La Liga players
2017 Africa Cup of Nations players
2019 Africa Cup of Nations players
2021 Africa Cup of Nations players
Olympic footballers of Ivory Coast
Footballers at the 2020 Summer Olympics
Ivorian expatriate footballers
Expatriate footballers in Italy
Expatriate footballers in Spain
Ivorian expatriate sportspeople in Italy
Ivorian expatriate sportspeople in Spain